Bumhpa Bum Wildlife Sanctuary is a protected area in Myanmar, covering an area of . It was established in 2004.

Bumhpa Bum Wildlife Sanctuary is contiguous with Khakaborazi National Park and Hukaung Valley Wildlife Sanctuary. It was established in 1996 with the objective to conserve the biodiversity of the Ayeyarwady and Chindwin river basins. It is managed by the Forest Department.

Biodiversity
Bumhpa Bum Wildlife Sanctuary harbours tropical evergreen forest along with pine hill forest.

Wildlife recorded during a camera trap survey in 2001 included binturong (Arctictis binturong), yellow-throated marten (Martes flavigula), spotted linsang (Prionodon pardicolor), Asian palm civet (Paradoxurus hermaphroditus), masked palm civet (Paguma larvata), crab-eating mongoose (Herpestes urva), clouded leopard (Neofelis nebulosa), Asiatic golden cat (Catopuma temminckii), leopard cat (Prionailurus bengalensis) and marbled cat (Pardofelis marmorata). Asian elephant (Elephas maximus), gaur (Bos gaurus), mainland serow (Capricornis milneedwardsii), red goral (Naemorhedus baileyi) and golden jackal (Canis aureus) inhabit the sanctuary as well.

References

Protected areas of Myanmar